Jacob Fairbank (born 4 March 1990) is an English professional rugby league footballer who plays  and  for Halifax in the Betfred Championship.

Background
Fairbank was born in Halifax, West Yorkshire, England.

He is the nephew of Bradford Northern legend Karl Fairbank.

Huddersfield
Fairbank signed for Huddersfield, and progressed through the youth system, finally making his début in Round 23 of the 2011 season against Hull Kingston Rovers. Since then he made a number of appearances for the first team. He also spent time on loan at Oldham RLFC (Heritage № 1349).

Bradford
In 2013, he was offered the chance to go to another Super League side on loan, Bradford Bulls. Fairbank signed a one-month deal at Bradford after they suffered an injury crisis in their pack. Fairbank featured in Round 15 (Salford) to Round 16 (Huddersfield). He was injured for Round 17-18.

Wakefield Trinity Wildcats
On 1 May 2014, Fairbank signed for the Wakefield Trinity Wildcats  on a one-month loan deal.

Halifax
In 2015, Fairbank signed a contract to join Halifax.

Statistics

References

External links
Halifax profile
2013 Huddersfield Giants profile

1990 births
Living people
Batley Bulldogs players
Bradford Bulls players
English rugby league players
Halifax R.L.F.C. players
Huddersfield Giants players
London Broncos players
Oldham R.L.F.C. players
Rugby league locks
Rugby league players from Halifax, West Yorkshire
Rugby league props
Wakefield Trinity players